Phintias may refer to:

Phintias (painter), the red-figure painter 
The city of Licata, known as "Phintias" in ancient times
Phintias of Agrigentum, tyrant of Agrigentum and founder of the above
The philosopher Pythias, also known as "Phintias"